Dhol Bajnay Laga was a Pakistani Ramadan special television drama serial aired on Hum TV during 2014. It stars Resham, Azfar Rehman and Javed Sheikh.

Cast 
 Resham
 Azfar Rehman
 Sohai Ali Abro
 Javed Sheikh
 Arslan Asad Butt 
 Zarnish Khan
 Asma Abbas

See also 
 List of programs broadcast by Hum TV
 2016 in Pakistani television

References

External links 
 Official website

Hum TV original programming
Pakistani drama television series